Dana Sawyer was born in Jonesport, Maine in 1951. He is a full-time professor of religion and philosophy at the Maine College of Art & Design and an adjunct professor in Asian Religions at the Chaplaincy Institute of Maine. He is the author of numerous published papers and books, including Aldous Huxley: A Biography, which Laura Huxley described as, "Out of all the biographies written about Aldous, this is the only one he would have actually liked." In 2014, Sawyer's authorized biography of Huston Smith was published.

Biography
Sawyer has been involved in fund-raising activities for the Siddhartha School Project in Stok, Ladakh, north India, for more than ten years.  This project has resulted in the construction of an elementary/ middle/high school for underprivileged Buddhist children that has been visited twice by the Dalai Lama, who holds it as a model for blending traditional and Western educational ideals.  Much of his work for this project has involved translating at lectures for (and teaching with) the school’s founder, Khen Rinpoche Lobzang Tsetan, who is the abbot of the Panchen Lama’s monastery in Mysore, India.

Sawyer's interest in the phenomenon of Neo-Hindu and Buddhist groups in America led him to become a popular lecturer on topics of interest to these groups.  He has taught at the Kripalu Center (Lenox, MA), the Barre Center for Buddhist Studies (Barre, MA), the Vedanta Society of Southern California (Hollywood, CA), the Esalen Institute in Big Sur, California, and other such venues.  This work has also brought him into contact with several important figures in this field, including Stanislav Grof, Andrew Harvey, Huston Smith, Laura Huxley, Stephen Cope, Jeffery Kripal, and Alex Grey.

Sawyer has been to India eighteen times, most recently while on sabbatical during 2018, and has traveled extensively throughout the subcontinent: Nepal, Pakistan, Sikkim, Thailand, Cambodia, Hong Kong, and Japan.

Related to academic work Sawyer has lectured at the Kyoto University of Foreign Studies, Banaras Hindu University, the University of Riga, Latvia, the Huntington Library, and at colleges and conferences throughout the United States (interview footage of Sawyer from the Riga conference was featured in a British documentary, “Brand New World,” on the dangers of consumer culture).  In August, 2005, Sawyer was a participant in the by-invitation-only conference on “Government, Education, and Religion” at the Oxford Roundtable, Lincoln College, Oxford University.  He is a member of two academic societies: the Society for Asian and Comparative Philosophy (SACP) and the International Aldous Huxley Society, centered at the University of Munster in Germany.

Current projects: Sawyer worked closely with Huston Smith, noted scholar and author of The World's Religions, to write his authorized biography. He is also writing a short introduction to the Perennial Philosophy.

Selected publications
 Downeast Roshi, a feature article on Zen Master Walter Nowick, Tricycle, the Buddhist Review (New York, Spring 2008)
 Edited, and wrote the preface, for Khen Rinpoche Lbzang Tsetan, Peaceful Mind, Compassionate Heart.  Freeport, ME: Siddhartha School Project Press, 2008.
 Aldous Huxley as Environmental Prophet, in Aldous Huxley in America, a book of essays based on the Fourth International Symposium on Aldous Huxley, at Pasadena, CA, Aug.2008.  Muenster, Germany: the Centre for Aldous Huxley Studies, 2008.
 The Ersatz of Suchness, Aldous Huxley and the Spiritual Importance of Art in Essays on Aldous Huxley, a book based on the Third International Symposium on Aldous Huxley, at Riga, Latvia, Aug. 2004.  Muenster, Germany: the Centre for Aldous Huxley Studies, 2007.
 Essays on Aldous Huxley and Brave New World for The Encyclopedia of  Literature and Politics, M. Keith Booker, ed., London: Greenwood Press, 2005.
 Interview footage, discussing Huxley’s theories regarding the dangers of consumer culture, appears in the British documentary film, Brand New World, by Ewan Jones-Morris and Andrzej Wojcik (London, 2004).  This film won several awards and was featured at the British Museum in August 2007.
 Aldous Huxley’s Truth Beyond Tradition, Tricycle: the Buddhist Review, New York, fall 2003)
 What kind of a mystic was Aldous Huxley Anyway? - A brief appraisal of his mysticism, in Aldous Huxley Annual (volume II, pp. 207–218),  Bernfried Nugel, ed., published by the Centre for Aldous Huxley Studies, University of Munster, Munster, Germany, 2002.
 Aldous Huxley, a Biography (New York: Crossroad Publishing, 2002).
 Edited the Sanskrit and standardized the transliteration for Ananda Coomaraswamy’s, Yakshas: Essays in the Water Cosmology (Delhi: Oxford University Press, 1994).
 The Monastic Structure of Banarsi Dandi Sadhus, in Living Banaras: Hindu Religion in Cultural Context, Bradley Hertel and Cynthia Humes, eds. Wendy Doniger, chief editor of series (Buffalo, NY: SUNY Press, 1993, and republished, Delhi: Manohar, 1998).
 Huston Smith: Wisdomkeeper: Living The World's Religions, the authorized biography (Fons Vitae, 2014).

Awards
Maine College of Art, Portland, Maine.  Travel grant to photograph temples in Asia for use in courses and the college’s slide library, spring and summer, 1999.

Arthur Steindler Award (for teaching and academic excellence), University of Iowa, School of Religion, 1988.

Foreign language and Area Studies Fellowship (to study Hindi in India), U.S. Department of Education, 1988.

Graduate Fellowship in Sanskrit and Indian Philosophy, University of Toronto, Toronto, Ontario, fall, 1978.

Tuition Grant for Academic Excellence, University of Hawaii, Department of Asian Studies, 1977-1978.

Education
Ph.D. candidate, University of Iowa, School of Religion, Iowa City, Iowa
(comprehensive examinations, May 1988).  Major: History of Asian Religions with a primary focus on religion in modern India.  Dissertation unfinished, though much of it has been published.

M.A., University of Iowa, School of Religion, History of Asian Religions, 1993.

Oxford University, Oxford, England.  Accepted by the Oriental faculty to study for the D.Phil., with Richard Gombrich as advisor.  Attended during the Michelmas term, 1980.

University of Toronto, Toronto, Ontario.  Graduate courses in Sanskrit and Indian Philosophy (with Bimal Motilal), Fall 1978.

M.A., University of Hawaii, Dept. of Asian Studies, Honolulu, HI, 1978.  Major:
The Religions of India.

B.A., Western Connecticut State University, Danbury, CT, 1973.  Major: World
Literature.  Minor: philosophy.

Work experience
Jan. 1989 to present: Liberal Arts dept. Maine College of Art (current rank: associate professor), dept. chair 1995-1998.

Jan. 1989 to present: adjunct professor of Asian Religions, Bangor Theological - Seminary, Bangor, ME.  Course titles (all at graduate level): History of World Religions, History of Asian Religions, Introduction to Buddhist Traditions, Introduction to Hindu Traditions, Sociology of Religion.

Aug. 1985 to May 1988: teaching assistant, University of Iowa, School of Religion.  Course titles: Living Religions of the East, Religion and Society, Quest for Human Destiny.

Summer 1986: Instructor in world religions, Kirkwood Community College, Cedar Rapids, Iowa.

Aug. 1984 to May 1985: research assistant in Buddhist Studies under Dr. Wang Pachow, University of Iowa, School of Religion.

Fall 1977: teaching assistant, University of Hawaii, Dept. of Religion. Course: Introduction to World Religions.

References

1951 births
Living people
Writers from Maine
People from Washington County, Maine
Maine College of Art faculty
Bangor Theological Seminary faculty
Western Connecticut State University alumni
University of Iowa alumni
University of Hawaiʻi alumni